Diana was a merchant ship built at Whitby, England, in 1824. She made a number of voyages between England, India and Quebec with cargo and undertook one voyage transporting convicts to New South Wales. She was last listed in 1856.

Career
Diana first appeared in Lloyd's Register (LR) in 1824 with Braithwaite as owner and master, and trade London–Malta.

{| class=" wikitable"
|-
! Year
! Master
! Owner
! Trade
! Source & notes
|-
| 1825
| Braithwaite
| Braithwaite
| London–Malta
| LR
|-
| 1830
| Braithwaite
| Braithwaite
| Liverpool–Quebec
| LR'
|-
|}

Under the command of George Braithwaite and surgeon James Ellis, she sailed from Woolwich, England on 11 December 1832, stopped at Cape Colony and arrived at Sydney on 26 May 1833. She embarked 100 female convicts and had no deaths en route. While at the Cape she picked up the convict Mina Magerman for transportation. A number of women and children passengers accompanied the voyage.Diana departed Port Jackson on 3 August 1833, bound for Batavia in ballast but with passengers.Diana'' changed her registry to Hull in 1851.

Citations and references
Citations

References
 
 

1824 ships
Ships built in Whitby
Convict ships to New South Wales
Age of Sail merchant ships
Merchant ships of the United Kingdom